Elk Cove is a meadow in the Mount Hood Wilderness on the north side of Mount Hood in the U.S. state of Oregon. It is a popular backpacking area along the Timberline Trail.

In popular culture
The 1987 film Overboard starring Kurt Russell and Goldie Hawn, as well as its 2018 remake, is set in "Elk Cove, Oregon", although the Elk Cove in the movies appear to be a populated small town on the Oregon coast in Tillamook County, whereas the real Elk Cove lies further inland.

External links 
  Gallery of Ray Atkeson photos of Elk Cove
 Trails Northwest hike to Elk Cove

Grasslands of Oregon
Meadows in the United States

Mount Hood National Forest